Groult is a surname. Notable people with the surname include:

André Groult (1884–1966), French decorator and designer
Benoîte Groult (1920–2016), French writer and activist
Flora Groult (1924–2001), French writer

Surnames of Norman origin
Germanic-language surnames